The Heart of Wetona is a 1919 American silent adventure drama film directed by Sidney Franklin and starring Norma Talmadge, Fred Huntley, and Thomas Meighan.

Plot
The film tells the story of some Comanche Indians and their preparations for a Corn Dance. The father of Wetona finds out she loves a white man.

Cast
 Norma Talmadge
 Fred Huntley
 Thomas Meighan
 Gladden James
 F.A. Turner

References

External links
 

1919 films
American silent feature films
American black-and-white films
Films directed by Sidney Franklin
American adventure drama films
1910s adventure drama films
Selznick Pictures films
1919 drama films
1910s American films
Silent American drama films
Silent adventure drama films
1910s English-language films